Youyi Road Station is a station of Line 1 of Wuhan Metro. It entered revenue service along with the completion of Line 1, Phase 1 on July 28, 2004. It is located in Jianghan District.

Station layout

Transfers
Bus transfers to Route 1, 2, 505, 571, 592, 622, 526, 527, 553, 592, 595, 601, 207, 507, 532, 535, 548, 561, 563, 721 and 803 are available at Youyi Road Station.

References

Wuhan Metro stations
Line 1, Wuhan Metro
Railway stations in China opened in 2004